Ten Mile Run is a tributary of the Millstone River, draining an area in southern South Brunswick and southern Franklin Park, New Jersey in the United States.

Its name is derived from the distance early surveyors estimated it was from the Raritan River on the historic Kings Highway, now Route 27.

Course
It crosses Route 27 and Gateway Boulevard. It then runs through the edge of a residential development and crosses New Road. It then joins several other tributaries that come from the development. It crosses Route 27 again, where it is marked with a sign. It follows a course roughly parallel to Bunker Hill Road and flows through Bunker Hill Golf Course. It crosses Butler Road and receives more tributaries.

Accessibility
Ten Mile Run is accessible by both road and trail in many places, such as the Bunker Hill Golf Course, the Bunker Hill Natural Area, the Ten Mile Run Greenway, and several others.

Animal life
Ten Mile Run is home to a multitude of small fishes with sizes ranging from 1 to 6 inches. It also is home to several frogs in the slow-moving places. Several crayfish may be found through baiting or diligent searching.

Terrain
Ten Mile Run is generally rocky. Its tributaries in the residential development are completely rocky and come from springs routed underground through storm drainage systems. Near Butler Road, the stream has natural floors, smooth rocks covering the streambed. They tend to be slippery from underwater plants. Some shale cliffs are present near the stream, similar to but smaller than the ones lining the Nine Mile Run. Farther downstream, sandy streambeds predominate.

Sister tributaries
Beden Brook
Bear Brook
Cranbury Brook
Devils Brook
Harrys Brook
Heathcote Brook
Indian Run Brook
Little Bear Brook
Millstone Brook
Peace Brook
Rocky Brook
Royce Brook
Simonson Brook
Six Mile Run
Stony Brook
Van Horn Brook

Gallery

See also
List of rivers of New Jersey
Raritan River
Millstone River

References

External links
USGS Coordinates in Google Maps

Tributaries of the Raritan River
Rivers of New Jersey
Rivers of Middlesex County, New Jersey